Frederica M. Williams, MBA, FCIS (born 1958) has served as the president and chief executive officer of Whittier Street Health Center in Boston, Massachusetts since 2002.

Family background
Frederica Williams was born in Freetown, Sierra Leone. Her family belong to the Creole ethnic group in Sierra Leone. She is the third child of the late Matilda Effeh Williams, an entrepreneur and philanthropist, and Emeric A. Williams, Sr., deputy general manager of the Sierra Leone External Telecommunications.

Education and career
Williams attended the London School of Accountancy, passed the examinations of the Institute of Chartered Secretaries and Administrators, United Kingdom, and was elected fellow of the institute. She obtained a graduate certificate in administration and management from the Harvard University Extension School and a Master in Business Administration with a concentration in finance from Anna Maria College in Paxton, Massachusetts. She also passed the exams of the Institute of Administrative Management (UK) with distinction and has participated in several executive education programs at the Harvard University Business School.

She moved from London, UK, to Boston in 1984 and worked at various hospitals until joining Whittier Street Health Center in February 2002 as its president and chief executive officer. In addition to fostering an environment of proactive health care and energizing a community, Williams has brought sound financial stewardship to Whittier to ensure that the services and resources offered by Whittier will be available for generations to come. Since Williams began at Whittier, the number of people served increased from 5,000 to 25,000 in 2012, and is now close to 30,000 in 2018.

Under Williams’ direction, Whittier has embarked upon a community outreach campaign, which has included hosting New England's largest men's health summit, making health care practitioners available at local houses of worship, and providing residents of public housing with on-site access to health screenings. Under her leadership, the health center also built its first permanent 78,900-square foot, Silver LEED-certified health facility in 2012, with the capacity to provide 220,000 visits annually, and, in 2015, it inaugurated its innovative Health and Wellness Institute to help address chronic diseases in inner-city Boston and to provide affordable access to a state of the art exercise facility and community garden for thousands of residents and patients in need.

In June 2017, Ms. Williams’ vision to have a second clinic in North Dorchester was realized. This clinic is located in a senior housing building in a high need neighborhood.

In 2018, Williams was recognized for her efforts to make the now nationally distinguished health center a reality, and honored by the WSHC Board of Directors who officially named the building “Frederica M. Williams Building” On this anniversary Williams is also being acknowledged for her other accomplishments at WSHC, which include opening a satellite clinic on Blue Hill Avenue in Roxbury, building a 6,600-square-foot fitness center at the Tremont location, the creation of a community garden, launching a mobile health van outreach initiative, a partnership with the Dana–Farber Cancer Institute, and a men's health clinic. On December 6, 2019, the Patriot Vanguard of Sierra Leone proudly recognized Ms. Williams’ life mission, business and social justice leadership.

On November 24, 2020, Harvard Extension School named Ms. Williams (C.S.S., '91) the recipient of its 2020 Dean Michael Shinagel Award for Service to Others, presented by the Harvard Extension Alumni Association. Barbara O’Reilly, director of the Alumni Awards, said: "Frederica Williams embodies exceptional leadership advancing social change in addressing health and economic disparities and social justice in the Greater Boston community."

On February 20, 2021, Frederica M. Williams launched scholarship funds to educate young children in Freetown, Sierra Leone.

In December 2020, Frederica M. Williams was recognized for her tireless efforts in addressing social justice and health equity at all times, especially in times of crises during the COVID-19 pandemic. Under her leadership, Whittier Street Health Center expanded its range of services to include Mobile Health Services to remove barriers to care such as transportation, location, access and hours of work for essential workers. Whittier manages four Mobile Health Units that provides a wide range of services including Boston Public School-Based clinics, medication delivery, dental hygiene services, health screenings, primary care, behavioral health screenings, vision screenings, linkage and HIV Counseling and Testing. With the addition of Mobile Health Units, Whittier will be able to deliver an unprecedented level of care to our patients and be a constant presence within the underserved communities to improve access and health outcomes:

Ms. Williams is credited for leading and implementing innovative, high-quality and affordable health care and social services to address health equity, social justice and the economic iniquities impacting low-income and Black, Indigenous and People of Color. On June 21, 2021, she led the 21st Annual Men's Health Summit to highlight the high mortality rates of men, especially men of color. This 2021 theme “Men Take Action on Holistic Health and COVID-19: Physical, Mental & Economic Wellbeing,” was chosen not only to highlight the far reaching effects of the COVID-19 pandemic, but also to educate people about the importance holistic health plays in everyday life.

In April 2020, former Mayor Marty Walsh appointed a group of BIPOC leaders to join the COVID-19 Health Inequities Task Force. Frederica M. Williams was one of the leaders tasked with developing strategies to address racism as a public health issues and recommendations to promote health equity and social justice. In July 2021, the Boston Health Inequities Task Force released the Boston Health Equity Now Plan. The Health Equity Now Plan is only an initial step towards the long recovery from COVID-19.

To reach the 8 goals, the plan provides 18 key recommendations that focus on acknowledging racism, creating educational and financial opportunities, and proactive community engagement. The full list of recommendations are detailed in the report.

The Task Force urged leaders from all corners of Boston to take part in rebuilding a Boston free of racial and health inequities. These recommendations provide actionable steps to addressing racism and health inequities.

In March 2021, Williams headed the public health sub-committee of the project guiding Kim Janey's then-expected transition into the position of acting mayor of Boston.

June 26, 2021, Williams launched a fleet of Mobile Health Van programs to serve residents and patients at schools, public housing developments, faith institutions, employment, homeless shelters, Street outreach and congregate settings. The services include primary care, HIV and Infectious Diseases testing and screenings, dental, behavioral health, and linkage to care and support services. These culturally sensitive services remove barriers to care, address the social determinants of health, and improve health outcomes and access. All patients are served regardless of their health insurance status.

December 31, 2021: Williams and Whittier was highlighted by Shirley Leung of the Boston Globe for the center's services to the homeless at Mass and Cass Blvd, a former tent city occupied by vulnerable residents including those suffering from mental illnesses, substance use disorders, and other chronic conditions. The Whittier outreach team provides services at several hotspots in Boston including Mass and Cass

December 31, 2021: First Night Vaccination Clinic: Williams partnered with the city's Health department to host a popular First Night COVID-19 Vaccine Clinic to address vaccine hesitancy. This New Year's Eve clinic and all other pop-up clinics held various locations have significantly increase the vaccine equity.

May 24, 2022, Ms. Williams was named the recipient of the 2022 Dean Michael Shinagel Award for Service to Others from the Harvard Extension Alumni Association.

On October 13, 2022, Frederica M. Williams and her team launched a Day Engagement Center to serve the Homeless and Vulnerable citizens of Boston. Whittier's Engagement Center will adopt a therapeutic milieu approach to encourage healthier ways of thinking and promote healthy lifestyles, while providing access to clinical and medical services. One of the most powerful aspects of the therapeutic milieu approach is the idea that everyone in the program, staff and clients alike, deserves respect. In the milieu setting, individuals will be given both the access and the choice whether to attend scheduled groups and/or to utilize the provided clinical services. By allowing individuals to have the ability to choose desired services rather than requiring participation, power and authority are distributed in an egalitarian way. This shared authority approach allows everyone in the program to have a greater sense of agency and responsibility.  

In March 2023, Williams launched Whittier’s Mobile Health Services Behavioral Health Screening Program to help identify substance use and mental health disorders early to help individuals and families access resources, including appropriate, evidence-based care. The mobile health screening help to determine the probability of the presence of a problem and identify areas of concern. Substance use and mental health disorders are common and are often not diagnosed and remain untreated. Such disorders can create significant family, social, and health problems. Early identification of mental health and substance use disorders can improve health and relationships, as well as help provide safe and nurturing environments. The screenings are performed by the community outreach team through the Mobile Health Services and helps to distinguish between individuals who could benefit from minimal intervention and others who may require further diagnostic assessment and treatment. Similar to a routine vitals screening, mental health screening for depression and substance abuse helps individuals understand current emotional health. Screening for depression and substance use can help an individual begin to fully recognize the impact the condition has.

Benefits of routine depression and substance use screenings:

·        Removes barriers to care including transportation

·        Allows early identification and intervention of underlying problems

·        Early treatment leads to better outcomes

·        Can lessen long-term disability

·        Reduces social stigma surrounding mental illnesses

Awards and citations 
 2020: Harvard Extension School, Dean Michael Shinagel Award for Service to Others.
 2019: The Boston Globe Magazine and The Commonwealth Institute, Top 100 Women-Led Businesses in Massachusetts Award.
2017: The Boston Globe Magazine and The Commonwealth Institute, Top 100 Women-Led Businesses in Massachusetts Award
 2016: The Boston Business Journal: Power 50 List: Game-Changers
 2015: The Boston Business Journal: Power 50 List, 
 2015: The Boston Business Journal, Transformations: Meet the Men and Women Reshaping Views and Impressions of Greater Boston's Real Estate Landscape, 
 2015: Globe Magazine Awards Whittier Top Women Led Businesses in MA ,  
 2014: The Boston Globe Magazine and The Commonwealth Institute, Top 100 Women-Led Businesses in Massachusetts Award 
 2013: Men's Health Award Massachusetts Medical Society
 2013: Commonwealth Compact, Diversity Stand-Out Award
 2013: National Black MBA Association, Nonprofit Diversity Trailblazer
 2013: Volunteers of America,  Susan Wornick and Myrna Billian Community Leadership Award
 2012: White House Communications Agency for exceptional community service
 2011: The Network Journal, 25 Influential Black Women in Business
 2011: Pinnacle Award by the Women’s Network of the Boston Chamber of Commerce 
 2011: Bill and Kerry Brett. Boston, Inspirational Women
 2010: Community Leadership Award from the Mayor’s Office of New Bostonians 
 2010: Boston Business Journal, Health Champion Award for Community Outreach
 2010: Massachusetts League of Community Health Center's Outstanding Massachusetts Health Center Executive Director Award
 2009: The WMJX-106.7FM's Exceptional Women in Healthcare Award
 2009: Profiles in Diversity Journal, Women Worth Watching
 2008: Women Business Magazine, Top 10 Heroes Award
 2008: University of Massachusetts-Boston, Robert H. Quinn Award for Community Leadership

Memberships
Williams is a trustee of Eversource Energy (formerly Northeast Utilities), New England's largest energy provider in Connecticut, Massachusetts, and New Hampshire. She is also a member of the board of trustees for Dana–Farber Cancer Institute, the Massachusetts League of Community Health Centers, Boston HealthNet, Women Business Leaders in Health Care, the Massachusetts Women's Forum, and the International Women's Forum.

References

Living people
1958 births
Anna Maria College alumni
American health care chief executives
American women chief executives
Sierra Leone Creole people
People of Sierra Leone Creole descent
Harvard Extension School alumni